This is a list of Asian Club Championship and AFC Champions League winning managers. Israeli Yosef Merimovich won the first two finals of the competition with Hapoel Tel Aviv and its rival Maccabi Tel Aviv when it was known as the Asian Champion Club Tournament. The competition became the Asian Club Championship upon its resurrection in 1985 and rebranded the AFC Champions League in 2002 after a merge between the Asian Club Championship and the Asian Cup Winners' Cup. The latest iteration of the competition is run in a single year from 2004 to 2021 (de jure 2022) before returning to double year from the 2023–24 season.

Six managers have won the tournament the most with two titles; Choi Kang-hee, Anghel Iordănescu, Kim Ho, Merimovich, Charnwit Polcheewin, and Park Seong-hwa. Only two who have won the title with two clubs: Merimovich (in 1967 with Hapoel Tel Aviv and 1969 with Maccabi Tel Aviv) and Iordănescu (with Al-Hilal in 1999–2000 and Al-Ittihad in 2005). Only one man has won the tournament both as a player and as a manager: South Korean Shin Tae-yong. He is among the nine different South Korean managers to have won the competition.

By year

By nationality
This table lists the total number of titles won by managers of each nationality.

References

Managers
AFC Champions League